Constance Mabel Keys RRC (30 October 1886 – 17 March 1964) was one of the most highly decorated nurses from Australia who served in World War I.  She was mentioned twice in despatches, was awarded the Royal Red Cross, First Class and the Médaille des Epidémies.

Biography
Keys was born in Mount Perry, a small town in the Wide Bay–Burnett region of Queensland, the seventh child of Irish immigrant James Keys, a schoolteacher and botanist, and his wife Margaret.  Trained at the Brisbane General Hospital as a nurse, she enlisted in September 1914 in the Australian Army Nursing Service, and was sent first to Egypt, later travelling onto Britain and then to France. She was the mother of Australian naturalist and conservationist Margaret Thorsborne .

References

1886 births
1964 deaths
Australian women nurses
Australian military nurses
Female nurses in World War I
Members of the Royal Red Cross